Ramón García García (March 5, 1924 – December 25, 2001) was a Cuban professional baseball player. He appeared in four Major League games as a relief pitcher for the Washington Senators during the  season. He was born in La Esperanza, Cuba.

García posted a 17.18 earned run average and did not have a decision in four relief appearances, giving up seven runs on eleven hits and four walks while striking out two in 3⅔ innings of work.

He also pitched in minor league baseball from 1948 through 1953, posting a 49–36 record and a 3.76 ERA in 153 games.

García died in La Habana, Cuba, at the age of 77.

See also
1948 Washington Senators season
List of Major League Baseball players from Cuba

Sources

Major League Baseball pitchers
Major League Baseball players from Cuba
Cuban expatriate baseball players in the United States
Washington Senators (1901–1960) players
Chattanooga Lookouts players
Decatur Commodores players
Havana Cubans players
Lubbock Hubbers players
Portsmouth Cubs players
St. Petersburg Saints players
1924 births
2001 deaths